Xiao Wenjiao (born December 1967) is a Chinese geologist and researcher at the Chinese Academy of Sciences's Institute of Geology and Geophysics and Xinjiang Institute of Ecology and Geography.

Education
Xiao was born in Lianyuan, Hunan in December 1967. In 1989 he graduated from Changchun Institute of Geology (now Jilin University). He received his master's degree in structural geology from China University of Geosciences (Beijing) in 1992 and doctor's degree in sedimentology from the Institute of geology, Chinese Academy of Sciences (CAS) in 1995, respectively.

Career
In November 1995 he joined the Institute of Geology and Geophysics, Chinese Academy of Sciences (CAS), becoming associate research fellow in December 1998 and research fellow in December 2003. He was a visiting scholar at the ETH Zurich (1998–1999) and University of Hong Kong (2004). He was a visiting professor at the University of Leicester in 2005.

Honours and awards
 2010 5th Huang Jiqing Young Geological Science and Technology Award
 2012 State Natural Science Award (Second Class) 
 November 22, 2019 Member of the Chinese Academy of Sciences (CAS)

References

External links
Xiao Wenjiao on the Chinese Academy of Sciences (CAS) 

1967 births
Living people
People from Lianyuan
Scientists from Hunan
Jilin University alumni
China University of Geosciences alumni
Members of the Chinese Academy of Sciences